Pamela Jane Barclay Brown (born 1948) is an Australian poet.

Career 

Pam Brown was born in Seymour, Victoria. Most of her childhood was spent on military bases in Toowoomba and Brisbane. Since her early twenties, she has lived in Melbourne and Adelaide, and has travelled widely in the Pacific and Indian Ocean regions as well as Europe and the U.S., but mostly she has lived in Sydney, on the unceded land of the Eora Nation. She has made her living variously as a silkscreen printer, bookseller, postal worker and has taught writing, multi-media studies and film-making. Pam Brown worked from 1989 to 2006 as a librarian at University of Sydney.

From 1997 to 2002 Pam Brown was the poetry editor of Overland and from 2004 to 2011 she was the associate editor of Jacket magazine. She has been a guest at poetry festivals worldwide, taught at the University for Foreign Languages, Hanoi, and during 2003 had Australia Council writers residency in Rome. In 2013 she held the Distinguished Visitor Award at the University of Auckland, New Zealand.

Awards and nominations
Nominations
 1984 — NSW Premier's Literary Award for Poetry for New & Selected Poems 1971–1982
 1999 — NSW Premier's Kenneth Slessor Award for Poetry for 50-50
 2004 — The Age Book Of The Year Award — Poetry, VIC for True Thoughts
 2010 — Adelaide Festival Award for Poetry, SA for True Thoughts
 2010 — The Age Book Of The Year Award — Poetry, VIC for Authentic Local
 2018 — Judith Wright Calanthe Award — Poetry, QLD for click here for what we do
 2019 — Prime Minister's Literary Award for Poetry — for click here for what we do
 2023 — NSW Premier's Kenneth Slessor Award for Poetry — for Stasis Shuffle

Awards
 2004 — New South Wales Premier's Kenneth Slessor Prize for Poetry for Dear Deliria: New & Selected Poems
 2018 — Adelaide Festival Award for Poetry, SA for Missing up
 2019 —  ALS Gold Medal for click here for what we do
 2022 — Judith Wright Calanthe Award — Poetry, QLD for Stasis Shuffle

Bibliography

Books published 
 Sureblock, (Pat Woolley, Melbourne, 1972)
 Cocabola's Funny Picture Book, (Tomato Press, Sydney, 1973)
 Automatic Sad, (Tomato Press, Sydney, 1974)
 Cafe Sport, (Sea Cruise Books, Sydney, 1979)
 Correspondences, (Red Press, Sydney, 1979)
 Country & Eastern, (Never-Never Books, Sydney, 1980)
 Small Blue View, (E.A.F./Magic Sam, Adelaide, 1982)
 Selected Poems 1971–1982, (Redress/Wild & Woolley, Sydney, 1984)
 Keep It Quiet, (Sea Cruise Books, Sydney, 1987)
 New & Selected Poems, (Wild & Woolley, Sydney, 1990)
 This World. This Place. (University of Queensland Press, Brisbane, 1994)
 50 – 50, (Little Esther Books, Adelaide, 1997)
 Text thing (Little Esther Books, Adelaide, 2002)
 Dear Deliria (New & Selected Poems), (Salt Publishing, UK/US/Aust, 2003)
 True Thoughts (Salt Publishing, U.K./U.S.A/Aust, 2008)
 Authentic Local (Soi 3 Modern Poets, papertiger media, Aust/Thailand, 2010 )Home by Dark (Shearsman Books, UK/US/Aust, 2013)Missing up (Vagabond Press, Tokyo/Sydney, 2015)Click here for what we do (Vagabond Press, Tokyo/Sydney, 2018)Endings & Spacings (Never-Never Books, Sydney, 2021)Stasis Shuffle (Hunter, Santa Lucia, 2021)

ChapbooksLittle Droppings (Never-Never Books,Sydney 1994)My Lightweight Intentions (Salt/Folio, U.K./Perth 1998)(2nd Edition Never-Never Books, Sydney 2006)Drifting Topoi (Vagabond Press, Sydney, 2000)eleven 747 poems (Wild Honey Press, Ireland, 2002)Let’s Get Lost (with Ken Bolton and Laurie Duggan)(Vagabond Press, Sydney 2005)Peel Me A Zibibbo (Never-Never Books, Sydney, 2006)farout_library_software (with Maged Zaher) (Tinfish Press, Hawai'i, USA 2007)Sentimental (Longhouse Books, USA 2010)In My Phone (Picaro Press, NSW 2011)Anyworld (flying island books, Macau, 2012)More than a feuilleton (Little Esther Books, Adelaide, 2012)

In translationAlibis poems translated from English into French by Jane Zemiro (Société Jamais-Jamais,Sydney 2014)

Electronic booksThe Meh of   Z    Z    Z    Z''    (AhaDada Books, US/Japan 2010)

References

External links 
 Website
 The Deletions (weblog)
 Pam Brown interviewed by John Kinsella
 Recording

1948 births
Australian women poets
Living people
Writers from Sydney